= Owen Hall (Oregon State University) =

Building on the Oregon State University campus in Corvallis, Oregon, U.S.

Coordinates: 44.56707°N 123.27375°W

Owen Hall is a building containing primarily instructional space, located at 1501 Southwest Campus Way on the Oregon State University campus in Corvallis, Oregon, United States. Originally called the Electrical and Computer Engineering (ECE) Building, it was renamed on October 24, 2009 to honor John Owen, the sixth dean of the university's College of Engineering (1990–97) and former head of the Electrical and Computer Engineering Department (1978-89), who died at age 62 on February 15, 1997. It was during Owen's tenure as dean that the college raised the funds to pay for the building's construction.

Currently the building is utilized primarily by the College of Liberal Arts.
